Group 3 of the UEFA Euro 1972 qualifying tournament was one of the eight groups to decide which teams would qualify for the UEFA Euro 1972 finals tournament. Group 3 consisted of four teams: England, Switzerland, Greece, and Malta, where they played against each other home-and-away in a round-robin format. The group winners were England, who finished two points above Switzerland.

Final table

Matches

Goalscorers

References
 
 
 

Group 3
1970–71 in English football
1971–72 in English football
1970–71 in Swiss football
1971–72 in Swiss football
1970–71 in Greek football
1971–72 in Greek football